Cristian Carrara (born January 28, 1977) is an Italian composer who is active in the Italian social and institutional scene.

Early life 
Born in Pordenone, Carrara graduated in composition from the Conservatory "Jacopo Todini" in Udine under Renato Miani. He is the author of mainly symphonic and chamber music, but also pieces for the musical theatre and television. His compositions are regularly performed in prestigious concert halls, such as the National Academy of St Cecilia. in Rome, the Berliner Hall, the Maggio Musicale Fiorentino, the Binyanei Hauma Auditorium in Jerusalem.

Carrara collaborates with several famous international artists, among them orchestra conductors such as Matthieu Mantanus, John Neschling, Flavio Emilio Scogna, Meir Wellber, Paolo Olmi, Michalis Economou, Jan Latham-Koenig, Lior Shambadal and soloists Alda Caiello, Roberto Abbondanza, Roberto Prosseda, Floraleda Sacchi, Francesco D’Orazio, Francesco Dego, and Stefano Montanari.

His music is performed by important ensembles and orchestras, such as the Orchestra Sinfȏnica Municipal of San Paolo, the Orchestra della Universidad Nacional Autónoma of Mexico City, the Philharmonic Orchestra of Fenice in Venice, the Filarmonica Toscanini in Parma, the Regional Tuscan Orchestra, the Orchestra of the Lyric Theatre in Cagliari, the Qatar Symphony Orchestra, the Berliner Symphoniker, the Ra’anana Symphonette and the Orchestre Lyrique et Symphonique de Nancy.

Works

Stage work 
 Sola Beatitudo (2017)
 Cindarella (2016)
 Faust (2015)
 Canzone dei luoghi comuni [Songs of commonplace] (2014)
 Il giocatore. Soliloquio dalla fossa [The player. Soliloquy from the grave] (2014)
 Oliver Twist (2012)
 La Piccola Vedetta Lombarda [The Little Lookout of Lombardy] (2011)

Solo instrument 
 Neve corrente [Running snow] (2013)
 Carillon (2013)
 A piano diary (2011)

Soloist and orchestra 
 The Waste Land, viola concerto (2016)
 Machpela, dialogue for violin, cello and orchestra (2016)
 War silence (2015)
 A peace overture (2011)
 Liber mundi (2011)
 Magnificat (2011)
 Face to face (2010)
 East West Romance (2009)
 Destinazione del sangue [Destination of blood] (2008)
 Infinito silenzio [Infinite silence] (2004)
 Cantico dei cantici [Song of songs] (2001)

Orchestra 
 Eveline (2016)
 Vivaldi. In memoriam (2014)
 Alto sui pedali [High on pedals]. Suite for bicycle and orchestra (2014)
 Ondanomala, Vajont, 9 Ottobre 1963 [Tsunami, Vajont, 9 October 1963] (2013)
 Alto sui pedali [High on pedals] (2013)
 Visioni romane [Roman vision] (2013)
 Tales from the underground (2012)
 Mater (2009)
 Icone [Icons] (2009)

Chamber 
 Le Petit Prince (2017)
 Ludus (2013)
 A little tango to my wife (2011)
 Memorie dal sottosuolo [Tales from the underground] (2011)
 Trilogia della bellezza [Trilogy of beauty] (2007)
 Pater (2007)
 Quartet no. 2 (2001)
 Com’è l’aldilà [What afterlife is like] (2001)
 Sonata (2001)
 Quartet no. 1 (2001)

Discography

Monographies 
 Faust in the sky, Warner Classics, 2017
 Magnificat and other orchestral works, Brilliant Classics, 2015
 La Piccola Vedetta Lombarda (lit. The Little Lookout of Lombardy), Ed. Tactus, DDD TC 970303, 2012
 Ludus, Amadeus Art AAP13001, 2013
 Liber Mundi, Arts Music/ Curci edition, 2012
 A piano diary, Incipit Records / Egea Music, 2011
 Destinazione del sangue- Icone [Destination of blood – Icons], Ed. Nuova Stradivarius, 2009

Collaborations 
 Bianco [White], in A tribute to Alberto Burri, ed. A Simple lunch, 2015
 Luce [Light], in Crossroads, Vdm records, 2007
 Infnito silenzio [Oh infinite silence], in Tra le tue braccia [In your arms], series of Solidarity art, Curci 2005
 Canzone tra le guerre [Songs between wars], in Souvenir d'Italie, Liber@, 2007

Critical opinions 

Positive opinions have been made on his compositions by several personalities.

 "He is an author who composes easily" – Giorgio Battistelli
 "I know that I'd like to share his music with others and listen to it over and over again" – Rob Haskins
 "His music is close to the heart, it's clear, but not simple, it's direct but it speaks a language full of mistery: the language of poetry" – Elena Formica
 "the writing is very attentive to the balance and the delicacy of the harmonic texture, but it's great in its creative intentions for which the whole context manifests itself solid and clear, capable of revealing – beyond the curtain of apparently simple music – the terrible question of the ominous outcome of what is declared to be good, that is what a war, any war, brings about." – Claudio Strinati
 "Carrara shows, in his music, the Italian quality, a lyric expression full of beautiful sentiments." – Jorge Coli
 "In Carrara's music there's an aware recovery of consonance and melody, which recall the archaic Mediterranean tradition with the precise intention of making a profound descriptive ability emerge, the ability to create in the mind of a listener the innovative images and visions of a continuous timbre flow mixture that become 'characters' right away." – Flavio Emilio Scogna
 "With the extreme coherency, the evocation of this music results very transparent and direct, especially because it is free of the rule of originality at all costs, the one pursued even when there's nothing original to show." – Federico Capitoni
 "The music of Cristian Carrara has a precious gift, a very rare one for our time and for contemporary composers: it speaks directly to the heart of a listener, crosses the high barriers of decades of complex intellectual ponderings and cultural dogmas imposed by sterile logic of the party. Andrea Milanesi, Liber Mundi by Cristian Carrara, the music of our day that speaks to everyone."

Other musical works 
Cristian Carrara is an author and host of television music shows and he created and directed the discographic series "solidarity art', promoted by Curci, Feltrinelli/Ricordi MediaStores and by Christian Associations of Italian Workers. Together with Antonella Ruggiero, he is also author of the song "Song between wars" performed in Sanremo in 2007, winner of the Lunezia Prize for Sanremo of the same year, and one of the finalists of the UNICEF Prize.

Other activities 
He is active in the Italian social and institutional scene; he was National Youth Secretary of Christian Associations of Italian Workers from 2002 to 2005 and he has created the National Youth Forum of which he was founder and first spokesperson from 2004 to 2009. He was also president of the Christian Associations of Italian Workers – provincial associations of Rome in 2012 and 2013. Ha has been President of the Centre of Youth Political Studies CNEL (National Council of Economy and Labour) – FNG (National Youth Forum) and the general manager of the Achille Grandi Foundation for Common Good, from December 2014 as regional counsellor; he is President of the Commission for Culture and member of the Commissions for Budget, Social Policy and Health of the Regional Council of Lazio

References

External links
 

1977 births
Living people
People from Pordenone
Italian composers